El Llano may refer to:
El Llano, Aguascalientes, Mexico
El Llano, Panama
El Llano, Dominican Republic
El Llano, Arizona, United States

See also 
 Llano (disambiguation)